The Greece national under-19 football team is the national football team of Greece and is controlled by the Hellenic Football Federation. In July 2007 the Under-20/19 Football Team finished second in the 2007 UEFA European Under-19 Football Championship in Linz, Austria. They also reached the final of the 2012 UEFA European Under-19 Football Championship.

History

First and early years 
The Youth National Team of Greece (U-18) was first set up in 1956 for their participation in the UEFA European Under-18 Championship, which was held in Hungary. Since then, they have been continuously participating in European Youth Leagues, formerly as U-18 and since 2002 as U-19. They have qualified several times in the final stage and has played twice in the final of the event: in 2007 and 2012 and three times in the final: 1974 and 1999 (defeated) and 1995 (who beat and took third place).

The road to Austria 
Greece Under-19 Team started the campaign leading to the 2007 UEFA European Under-19 Football Championship in October 2006. During the first qualifying round the team was seeded in the Group 1, with Bulgaria (hostess), Ukraine and Kazakhstan being the other participants in the group. Greece finished at the top of the Group 1, after two wins against the hosts Bulgarians (2–0 on October 20, goals by Lampropoulos and Vallianos) and Ukraine (2–1 on October 25, goals by Vasilis Pliatsikas and Lampropoulos). The team also lost 4–2 to Kazakhstan (October 22, goals by Kostas Mitroglou and Pliatsikas).

Greece hosted the next phase, called Elite Round, facing now stronger opponents. Against Croatia on June 1 of 2007, Greece was held to 2–2 by a late equaliser despite two goals from the Greek promising attacker Kostas Mitroglou. Two days later, Mitroglou stroke against and lead the team to a 2–0 win against Italy, Siovas scoring the other goal. Finally, on June 6, Greece crushed Sweden 4–0, with goals from Papadopoulos, Mitroglou, Ath. Papazoglou and a late own-goal from the Swedish team. Again, Greece U-19 Team sealed the first place of the group.

2007 European Under-19 Championship in Austria 
Greece was seeded in the Group A with Austria, Portugal and Spain. The team started with a precious victory against Portugal (16 July 2007), in a close encounter with many opportunities from both sides. Sotiris Ninis and Kostas Mitroglou were a constant danger and finally the second scored on the 52nd minute. Two days later, Greece faced the hosting Austria team and also the crowd that filled the stadium in Pasching. Ninis showed great vision breaking the Austrian defense with a through ball that brought Mitroglou alone against the opponent goalkeeper. Mitroglou scored again but the hosts scored a second half goal from penalty and the match ended 1–1. On July 21 Greece faced holders and favourites Spain. Both teams qualified after a goalless draw, despite a good second half performance from the Greek side and a lost penalty by Mitroglou.

The semifinal against Germany was held on July 24 in Steyr. The German side included promising stars with experience in the Bundesliga, such as Sebastian Tyrala, Jerome Boateng, and Anis Ben-Hatira. The Germans, who had finished first in Group B, started strongly and piled up pressure until they scored on the 25th minute with Ben-Hatira. Greece responded almost immediately with shots from Papadopoulos, Vasilis Pliatsikas and Mitroglou and it was Sotiris Ninis, Greece's wonderkid who unlocked the German defense on the 40th minute to score a deserved equaliser. Greece seemed vivid in the start of the second half and had some chances until Ninis with a clever header found Mitroglou in the area 58 minutes after the start of the game. The Greek striker scored his third goal of the tournament and Greece was now ahead 2–1. On the 61st minute Vasilis Pliatsikas was shown a second yellow card and the team now is left with ten. Germany started its counterattack and was given a controversial penalty four minutes later, taken successfully from Ben-Hatira for the 2–2. Despite playing with ten men the Greek side managed to overcome the German pressure and tried to hit back. It was the 90th minute when Ninis took a corner from left, aimed Lambropoulos at the near post and the young forward beat the German goalkeeper to give a dramatic and memorable 3–2 win to the Greek side.

Greece faced Spain on July 27 in Linz. The Spanish coach, Juan Santisteban and his side were the holders and the first to reach successive U-19 finals. Players from giants Real Madrid, Valencia, Barcelona were among the Spanish players. The Greek team, on the other side was very confident and inspired by the coaching of Nikos Nioplias who pushed a ten-men team forward in the game against Germany. However Greece had two experienced players out. Vasilis Pliatsikas had faced a red card in the semifinal and the captain, central defender Sokratis Papastathopoulos picked a second yellow in the tournament when Germany was awarded a controversial penalty in the semifinal. It is said that the referee has acknowledged his mistake to Papastathopoulos after the game.

The game started with long shots from the Spanish team in the first ten minutes and the Greek team was also dangerous with Mitroglou and Ninis. Unfortunately Greece paid for the missed chances when Daniel Parejo scored a free-kick from a wide position on the 38 minute, after the best Spanish player, Aaron had won a foul from Siakas. Greece showed an impressive fight to come back with chances missed from Moniakis, Siovas, Mitroglou and Papadopoulos but the Spanish defence held during the second half. The Spanish team won the final but the Greek team deserved more with its display after the 1–0. Nikos Nioplias expressed his pride in the team after the game and the Spanish coach referred to a "great Greek side". Sotiris Ninis and Sokratis Papastathopoulos were included by UEFA in the "name-to-note" list after the end of the tournament. Kostas Mitroglou, with 3 goals in 5 games, shared the first scorer title with highly rated Ben-Hatira (Germany) and Monnet-Paquet (France).

2012 European Under-19 Championship in Estonia
Only three countries (Greece, Serbia and the defending champions, Spain) had been at the 2011 finals in Romania. The 2012 final tournament in Estonia served as a qualifying event for the forthcoming FIFA Under-20 World Cup, with Croatia, England, France, Greece, Portugal and Spain earning places at the final tournament to be played in Turkey from 21 June to 13 July 2013. The Spaniards started the tournament as the only country to have successfully defended the Under-19 title and, during the first half of their opening game against Greece, Julen Lopetegui’s side produced trademark patient, possession-based combination play with Gerard Deulofeu, in particular, creating danger with his skill on either flank. His run on the right provided Spain’s first goal but, after the second, they struggled with the higher pressing by the Greek team and needed resilience to hang on for a 2–1 win.

Against Greece, Estonia started well. But Greece took the lead through Giorgos Katidis and, improving in the second half, scored two magnificent goals. Karl-Eerik Luigend scored Estonia’s only goal of the tournament but Greece had the last word with a fourth goal. With Spain into the semi-finals and the hosts eliminated, the Portugal v Greece match in Rakvere took on must-win dimensions for the latter, whereas Edgar Borges’ team needed only a point. After a cautious start, the game burst into life in the 16th minute when Giannis Gianniotas cut in from the right and rounded off a fine individual effort with a left-footed finish. Within 60 seconds, André Gomes collected the ball outside the box, beat three defenders and levelled with a powerful shot. When Daniel Martins was shown a red card for violent conduct, Greece sensed their
opportunity and, a few minutes later, captain Katidis scored the first of his two goals. Even when the Greeks were also reduced to ten in the second half, they continued to dominate, even though substitute Betinho set up a nail-biting finish by making it 3–2 with a late goal.

The first was marked by the dismissal of Greek keeper Stefanos Kapino during added time at the end of the first half, when his team were leading 1–0. But the first action by reserve keeper Sokratis Dioudis was to save the ensuing penalty. England took the upper hand after equalising in the 56th minute but failed to beat Dioudis and were beaten by a counterattack in the 18th minute of extra-time.

In the final, against Spain both sides displayed admirable speed in transitions both from defence into attack and vice versa. While Spain’s No17, Gerard Deulofeu, operating on the right wing after the break, was a constant menace with his incisive dribbling movements, the Greeks, meanwhile, threatened with inswinging corners and free kicks from Kostas Stafylidis and Giannis Gianniotas respectively. Ten minutes before the end of the game, Gerard Deulofeu went to the byline and forced a save from the Greek keeper, Sokratis Dioudis, with a dangerous cutback. One minute later, and the decisive moment of the match arrived. With great tenacity, Spanish full-back Jonny stole the ball from the Greeks just inside their own half. Within the blink of an eye, the ball was transferred to right-wing partner Gerard Deulofeu. The latter ran to the heart of the Greek defence and slid a perfectly weighted, subtle through pass to his fellow winger, Jesé who scored the only goal.

UEFA European Under-19 Championship Record

Results and schedule
The following is a list of match results from the previous 12 months, as well as any future matches that have been scheduled.

2022

2023

Euro 2023 Under-19 Championship qualification

2023 UEFA European Under-19 Championship qualification

Group 1

Players

Current squad 
The following players were named in the squad for the friendly match against  on 28 February 2023.

Former squads 
2015 UEFA European Under-19 Championship squads – Greece
2012 UEFA European Under-19 Championship squads – Greece
2011 UEFA European Under-19 Championship squads – Greece
2008 UEFA European Under-19 Championship squads – Greece
2007 UEFA European Under-19 Championship squads – Greece
2005 UEFA European Under-19 Championship squads – Greece

See also 
Greece national football team
Greece national under-23 football team
Greece national under-21 football team
Greece national under-20 football team
Greece national under-17 football team

References

External links 
Greece U-19 at HFF 
Greece U-19 at UEFA
UEFA European U-19 Championship at uefa.com

European national under-19 association football teams
under
Youth football in Greece